Edva or EDVA may refer to:

Edva Jacobsen (born 1964), a Faroese economist and politician
Edva, a tributary of the Vym River
EDVA, ICAO designation for Flugplatz Bad Gandersheim
 E.D.Va., an abbreviation for the United States District Court for the Eastern District of Virginia